Loan words in Malayalam, excluding the huge number of words from Sanskrit originated mostly due to the centuries long interactions between the native population of Kerala and the trading (predominantly, spice trading) powers of the world. This included trading contacts with Arabia, Persia, Levant, Europe, and China spanning millennia, and with European colonial powers for several centuries. According to Sooranad Kunjan Pillai who compiled the authoritative Malayalam lexicon, the other principal languages whose vocabulary was incorporated over the ages were Arabic, Dutch, Pali, Persian, Portuguese, Prakrit, Syriac, and Urdu.

This is a dynamic list and may never be able to satisfy particular standards for completeness.

Middle East contributions

Arabic

The Arabic language contributes a large number of words into a dialect form of Malayalam, called Arabi Malayalam that is spoken by the Muslim Mappila community of North Kerala.
There are also many common words which are used throughout all communities of Kerala.
There are more than 900 words taken from Arabic and some are commonly used in spoken and literary forms of Malayalam.

Hebrew
The Hebrew language contributes a large number of words into a dialect form of Judeo-Malayalam that is spoken by the Cochin Jewish community of Kerala.

Persian 
There are a few words of Persian origin in Malayalam, though it is possible many of them could have been indirectly loaned from Urdu.

Aramaic or East Syriac
Suriyani Malayalam (or Karshoni), which used the East Syriac script to write Malayalam, was a popular medium of written communication among Saint Thomas Christians (Suriyani Christiani) in Kerala until the 19th century.

European contributions

Portuguese

Most of the loan words from Portuguese language are for items which the native population lacked when the encounter with Portuguese empire happened from around the final years of the 15th century.
Portuguese was the lingua franca in Africa, Brazil, South Asia and parts of South East Asia during the 16th, 17th and 18th centuries. The Portuguese Empire was the major ruling colonial power in South India during this period, they were first modern European power to encounter India on a large scale, and thus their language had a strong influence on Malayalam (similar to many other Indian languages).

The Portuguese language had also taken some words from Malayalam, and they should not be confused vice versa.

Dutch

English
There are lots of loanwords from English, which are used if there is no word for it for Malayalam or as a substitution for those who forgot the exact word. English words may be more commonly used by Malayali's abroad or new generations of Malayali's in Kerala. Here are some examples.

See also

List of loanwords in Sri Lankan Tamil
Sri Lankan Portuguese creole
Indo-Aryan loanwords in Tamil
List of loanwords in Konkani
List of loanwords in Gujarati
Tamil loanwords in other languages
List of loanwords in Indonesian
Portuguese vocabulary
List of English words of Dravidian origin
List of English words of Indian origin
List of English words of Arabic origin

References

 Borrowed words and pronunciation, Rajeev, Rediff
 A sacred language is vanishing from State, The Hindu
 Western Influence on Malayalam Language and Literature, Dr.K.M.George
 L. J. Frohnmeyer (1913) [1], Basel Mission Book and Tract Depository, page 300

Further reading
 
 
 

Malayalam language
Malayalam